This is a list of reportedly haunted locations in Japan.

Tokyo 

Sunshine 60
Built on the site of the former Sugamo Prison, where seven Japanese war criminals (including former Prime Minister Hideki Tojo) were hung in 1948. Soviet spy Richard Sorge was also hung in the prison in 1944. Since the prison's dismantlement and Sunshine 60's completion, there have been claims of supernatural sightings in and around the building.

Purportedly the resting place of Taira no Masakado, a rebellious Heian period warlord. There have been cases where construction workers disturbing the grave had accidents, with some dying as a result.

Oiwa Shrine
Believed to be the former home of a woman who was murdered by her husband.

Hachiōji Castle
An abandoned castle site. Visitors to the ruins claim to hear the screams of women.

Prudential Tower
In 1982, a fire in the building killed 33 people, making people believe it to be haunted.

Akasaka Mansion hotel
A woman claimed she was dragged across her room by an unseen force.

Doryodo Ruins
Two bodies were allegedly found on the site, a body of an elderly woman in 1963 and a young college student in 1973. The temple was demolished in 1985. Visitors have claimed to hear the screams of the two murder victims.

Kyoto 

Kiyotaki Tunnel
One of the most famous haunted locations in Kyoto. 

Midoro Pond
A spirit of a young girl is believed to haunt the pond.

Yamanashi 

Aokigahara
One of the most popular suicide sites in Japan, reputed to be haunted by the yūrei of those died there.

Oiran Buchi
According to a legend during the Warring States period, there was a gold mine in the area. The 55 prostitutes working there were killed to prevent them from sharing information about the gold.

Other 

Himeji Castle
Believed to be haunted by Banchō Sarayashiki.

Mount Osore
Believed to be a gateway to the underworld.

Gridley Tunnel
Located on a naval base in Yokosuka, Japan. Between midnight and 1:00 am on rainy nights, a samurai appears to solo explorers.

Maruoka Castle
According to legend, in 1576, a widow named Oshizu agreed to become hitobashira if her son became samurai for the lord. However, the lord was later transferred, and the promise was broken, so Oshizu flooded the castle’s moat every April.

Ryokufuso Inn
Allegedly home to a zashiki-warashi. Some guests have claimed they were touched by invisible fingers as they slept. Others have claimed to have seen ghostly white balls floating in the air.

See also 
 Japanese mythology
 List of haunted locations
 Japanese superstitions
 Kimodameshi
 Japanese urban legend
 Hyakumonogatari Kaidankai
Japanese haunted towns

References 

 
Haunted
Haunted

Lists of reportedly haunted locations